Hongqiao Township is a township of Ninglang Yi Autonomous County in northwestern Yunnan province, China, situated about  north-northwest of the county seat and  northeast of Lijiang as the crow flies. , it has 7 villages under its administration.

References 

Township-level divisions of Lijiang